DJ Misja Helsloot (born 21 January 1973, in Rotterdam) is a Dutch Trance and Progressive DJ.

In 1992, Helsloot, at the age of nineteen, started to purchase albums and organize his own parties. Mixing music with a friend, Misja worked hard for six years until he became friends with DJ Tiësto in 1998. Tiësto allowed Misja to mix his album In Trance we Trust 001. It was later released in September of the same year to a good reception in his home country the Netherlands, and also caught on in Israel and Norway.  A year after his CD was released Misja started his own record label, C4, which was a sublabel of Basic Beat Recordings of Rotterdam. Misja released his first CD on C4 titled The Creation - Day One. 

In 1999 as well, Misja played at Hyperstate in Denmark, and again played the same festival in 2001 in Norway. With success getting larger in Europe he was invited to a number 10 spot on the Forbidden Paradise CD compilation. In September 2000, one month after appearing on Forbidden Paradise, The Creation - Day Two was released to the public. In August 2001, along with Roland K and Maarten v Oosten, Misja founded his own independent label, Gesture Music. Nearly a year later, under the new company the first production by Misja was released, Misja Helsloot - First Second. Other major DJs, including Paul van Dyk picked up on it and it was played and mixed throughout many clubs. Now holding a respected place on the trance circuit, after playing at Love Fields and Dance Valley in the summer of 2002 in the Netherlands, Misja traveled the world doing parties from Tel Aviv to Miami. At the same time Misja's career had taken him back to the beginning with his release of In Trance We Trust 007. In 2004 Misja opened on the main stage of Trance Energy, one of the largest trance parties in the world.

Discography

12 Inch

 Back From Your Past (First Second, 2004)
 First Second (First Second, 2004)
 A Different World (Gesture Music, 2002)
 First Second (Gesture Music, 2002)
 The Beast Within' (Basic Beat, 2001)
 E-Mocean (Black Hole, 1998)

Mix CDs

 Deep Trance (Water Records, 2004)
 Back From Your Past (Gesture Music, 2004)
 Capital (Combined Forces, 2002)
 In Trance We Trust 007 (Black Hole, 2002)
 Forbidden Paradise 11 (Basic Beat, 2001)
 Oslo Central vol. 2 (Arcade Norway, 2001)
 The Creation - Day Two (Basic Beat, 2000)
 Forbidden Paradise 10 (Basic Beat, 2000)
 The Creation - Day One (Basic Beat, 2000)
 In Trance We Trust 001 (Black Hole, 1998)

Singles

 2018: Moving Souls (with Xijaro and Pitch) [Future Sound Of Egypt]

External links
www.misjahelsloot.com
Misja Helsloot at Myspace
Misja Helsloot discography at Discogs

1973 births
Living people
Dutch trance musicians
Musicians from Rotterdam